The Taieri River is the fourth-longest river in New Zealand and is in Otago in the South Island.

The upper reaches meander in a series of convoluted loops across a floodplain above Paerau, close to the aptly named locality of Serpentine; the river has created many small oxbow lakes in this area, some of which have been converted into water meadows. From here the river runs through two small hydroelectric power stations before reaching Patearoa in the Maniototo. The Taieri then arcs through almost 180 degrees, entering a broad glacial valley (the Strath-Taieri) surrounded by rugged hill ranges. Immediately downstream the river has cut a steep-sided declivity, the Taieri Gorge. This is known for the Taieri Gorge Railway, which follows a route into Central Otago through it. In the Taieri's lower reaches there is a broad floodplain (the Taieri Plains) containing much of Otago's most fertile farmland. The river then flows through the lower Taieri Gorge to the Pacific Ocean at Taieri Mouth. Taieri Island lies in the Pacific Ocean several hundred metres from the mouth of the river.

Towns along the river include Middlemarch, Outram, Allanton, Mosgiel, Henley, and Taieri Mouth. Its major tributary is the Waipori River, which meets the Taieri near Henley on the Taieri Plains. Google Maps erroneously shows the stretch of the river from the confluence to the mouth as Waipori River. The correct name is shown on the New Zealand government's official NZ Topo Map.

There are several possible conjectured derivations for the name Taieri. It may derive from Tai-ari, “to smash or pound up, to pulp”., though some sources suggest that not may come from the Māori word taiari meaning "spring tide" or "shining water". A further possibility is that it refers to the makotaieri, an edible shark once regarded as a delicacy along the Otago coast. It may be, however, that the shark took its name from the river rather than vice versa.

References

External links

 Taieri River at Te Ara - The Encyclopedia of New Zealand

 
Rivers of Otago
Rivers of New Zealand